NY LA is a 2003 album by jazz musician Steve Cole.  It features keyboards by Brian Culbertson and Marquis Dair and also vocals by  Mauli B.  It is Steve Cole's third studio album and reached as high as number six on the Billboard Top Contemporary Jazz Albums List.  It includes the hit song "Off Broadway" which went to the top of the charts in 2003.

Track listing
"NY LA" – 3:38
"Everyday" – 4:19
"Tonight It's On" (featuring Charlean Hines) – 3:31
"Love Letter" – 4:48
"Off Broadway" – 4:18
"Interlude IV" – 2:05
"Every Little Thing" – 3:27
"Missing You" – 4:45
"Close Your Eyes" – 3:38
"Keep It Live" (featuring Brevi and Aloe Blacc) – 10:33

References

2003 albums
Steve Cole albums
Warner Records albums